The 1972 San Francisco 49ers season was the franchise's 23rd season in the National Football League and their 27th overall.. The 49ers appeared in the playoffs for the third consecutive year.

After an early-season injury to quarterback John Brodie, Steve Spurrier stepped in and turned things around with brilliant performances to get the 49ers back in the playoff picture by going 5–2–1 over eight games. In the last game of the season, Brodie returned in the 4th quarter and threw two touchdown passes to lead the 49ers to a 20–17 victory over the Minnesota Vikings, as the 49ers won their third straight division title with an 8–5–1 record. In the divisional playoffs at Candlestick, the 49ers looked poised for a return to the NFC Championship game, leading the Dallas Cowboys 28–13 at the start of the 4th quarter. However, the Cowboys scored 17 unanswered points to defeat the 49ers. This was the third consecutive season that the 49ers lost to the Cowboys in the playoffs, and marked the 49ers' last postseason appearance until 1981.

Offseason

NFL Draft

Roster

Regular season

Schedule

Standings

Playoffs

Awards and records

Milestones

References

 1972 49ers on Pro Football Reference
 49ers Schedule on jt-sw.com

San Francisco 49ers
NFC West championship seasons
San Francisco 49ers seasons
1972 in San Francisco
San